Francesco Righetti (also known in Spanish as Francisco Righetti) was a Swiss architect who developed most of his works in Argentina, which would become his place of residence.

Among his most notable works include the Legislative Palace of Salta and the bell towers of San Francisco Church and the Church of the Vine, which are one of the highest bell towers in Argentina, were designed by the German José Enrique Rauch and constructs led Righetti. He also participated in the latest reform of the Cathedral of Salta and planning Plaza Güemes.

Personal life 
Righetti was married to Josefa Ferrini and had a daughter named Albertina.

He died in Rosario, Santa Fe, Argentina in 1917.

References 

1835 births
1917 deaths
Architects from Ticino
Swiss emigrants to Argentina
Argentine architects
Argentine Roman Catholics
Argentine people of Swiss-Italian descent
Naturalized citizens of Argentina
People from Salta